Father Patrick Lavelle (1825–1886) was a priest and Irish nationalist.
Lavelle was born in Mullagh, Murrisk, Co. Mayo, the son of Francis Lavelle a farmer. He was educated at the local hedge school and St Jarlath's College, Tuam. In 1844 he went to Maynooth College and was ordained a Catholic priest at St. Patrick's College, Maynooth, in 1851, and pursued postgraduate studies there as part of the Dunboyne Establishment. 
He was appointed in 1854 as a professor of philosophy in the Irish College in Paris against the wishes of rector Rev. Dr. John Miley, Lavelles radical politics would have been at odds with Miley who was supported by Cardinal Cullen, the other bishops supported lavelle. Along with philosophy, he taught the Irish Language at the college. He left Paris in 1858 and returned to Ireland.

He became nationally known in 1860 for his actions against proselytism in Toormakeady and its resultant evictions. He was nicknamed Patriot Priest Of Partry.

References

Sources
 Some Famous Mayo People, Bernard O'Hara, in Mayo:Aspects of its Heritage, pp. 272–274, 1982

1825 births
1886 deaths
Politicians from County Mayo
19th-century Irish people
People educated at St Jarlath's College
Alumni of St Patrick's College, Maynooth